Mikel Iribas Allende (born 13 April 1988) is a Spanish professional footballer who plays for CF Fuenlabrada as a right-back or midfielder.

Club career
Born in San Sebastián, Gipuzkoa, Iribas was a product of Real Sociedad's youth system, and played one sole season with the club's B team, in Segunda División B. In August 2008, he dropped down to the Tercera División and signed a contract with CD Mirandés, scoring twice in 30 games as the campaign ended in promotion.

Again as a first-team regular, Iribas helped to another promotion in 2011–12, contributing two goals in 1,868 minutes of action. On 17 August 2012, both he and the Castile and León side made their debut in the Segunda División, in a 0–1 loss against SD Huesca. He netted his first goal in the competition on 3 November, helping to a 3–0 home win over FC Barcelona B.

Iribas signed with AD Alcorcón also of the second tier in late June 2013. He left in June 2016, and subsequently returned to the third division with CF Fuenlabrada.

On 6 July 2019, after scoring twice from 31 appearances during the campaign (playoffs included), as the club achieved second-tier promotion for the first time in history, the 31-year-old Iribas renewed his contract for a further year.

References

External links

1988 births
Living people
Spanish footballers
Footballers from San Sebastián
Association football defenders
Association football midfielders
Segunda División players
Segunda División B players
Tercera División players
Primera Federación players
Antiguoko players
Real Sociedad B footballers
CD Mirandés footballers
AD Alcorcón footballers
CF Fuenlabrada footballers